The following is a list of the exports of Germany. Data is for 2012, in millions of United States dollars, as reported by The Observatory of Economic Complexity. Currently the top thirty exports are listed.

See also
 Economy of Germany

References
 atlas.media.mit.edu - Observatory of Economic complexity - Products exported by Germany (2012)

Germany
Exports
Foreign trade of Germany